Miniature Portraits is the second studio album by Five Style, released on August 24, 1999, by Sub Pop.

Track listing

Personnel 
Adapted from the Miniature Portraits liner notes.

Five Style
Leroy Bach – bass guitar, guitar, electric piano, Clavinet
Bill Dolan – guitar
John Herndon – drums, drum machine, congas
Jeremy Jacobsen – keyboards, guitar, acoustic guitar, bass guitar, steel drums, keyboards, organ, melodica, marimba, piano, electric piano, synthesizer

Production and additional personnel
Five Style – mixing
Mike Hagler – engineering, mastering, mixing
Jesse LeDoux – cover art

Release history

References

External links 
 

1999 albums
Five Style albums
Sub Pop albums